This is a checklist of American reptiles found in Northern America, based primarily on publications by the Society for the Study of Amphibians and Reptiles (SSAR). It includes all species of Bermuda, Canada, Greenland, Saint Pierre and Miquelon, and the United States including recently introduced species such as chameleons, the Nile monitor, and the Burmese python. Subspecies are listed only in a few cases. The information about range and status of almost all of these species can be found also in the IUCN Red List of Threatened Species site.

* alien species
Summary of 2006 IUCN Red List categories.
Conservation status – IUCN Red List of Threatened Species:

and Endangered Species Act:

Order: Crocodilia

Family: Alligatoridae

Family: Crocodylidae

Order: Testudines (turtles)

Suborder: Pleurodira

Family: Podocnemididae (side-necked turtles)

Suborder: Cryptodira

Family: Testudinidae (tortoises)

Family:  Emydidae

Family: Cheloniidae 

 Olive ridley sea turtle (Lepidochelys olivacea)  
 Loggerhead sea turtle (Caretta caretta)  (North Pacific: ,)
 Kemp's ridley sea turtle (Lepidochelys kempii)  
 Green sea turtle (Chelonia mydas)  (Hawaiian subpopulation: , Breeding colony populations in FL)
 Hawksbill sea turtle (Eretmochelys imbricata)

Family: Dermochelyidae 
 Leatherback sea turtle (Dermochelys coriacea)  (East Pacific Ocean subpopulation – i.e. Hawaiian Is.: , West Pacific Ocean subpopulation: , Northwest Atlantic Ocean subpopulation)

Family: Chelydridae

Family: Kinosternidae

Family: Trionychidae (softshells) 
 Florida softshell (Apalone ferox) 
 Smooth softshell (Apalone mutica) 
 Spiny softshell (Apalone spinifera) 
 Wattle-necked softshell (Palea steindachneri) *  (Hawaii only)
 Chinese softshell (Pelodiscus sinensis) *  (Hawaii only)

Order: Squamata (scaled reptiles)

Suborder: Iguania

Family: Agamidae (agamas)

Family: Chamaeleonidae (chameleons)

Family: Crotaphytidae (collared and leopard lizards)

Family: Iguanidae (iguanas)

Family: Phrynosomatidae

Family: Dactyloidae (anoles)

Family: Polychrotidae 
 Many-colored bush anole (Polychrus marmoratus) * (probably introduced)

Family: Corytophanidae (casquehead lizards) 
 Brown basilisk (Basiliscus vittatus) *

Family: Leiocephalidae (curly-tailed lizards) 
 Northern curly-tailed lizard (Leiocephalus carinatus) * 
 Red-sided curly-tailed lizard (Leiocephalus schreibersii) *

Suborder: Gekkota

Family: Gekkonidae (geckos)

Suborder: Autarchoglossa

Family: Lacertidae (wall or true lizards)

Family: Scincidae (skinks)

Family: Anguidae

Family: Anniellidae (American legless lizards)

Family: Helodermatidae (Gila monsters) 

 Gila monster (Heloderma suspectum)

Family: Teiidae (tegus or whiptails) 
 Giant ameiva (Ameiva ameiva) *
 Dusky giant ameiva (Ameiva praesignis) *
 Species split from the canyon spotted whiptail (Aspidoscelis burti) :
 Giant spotted whiptail (Aspidoscelis (burti) stictogramma) 
 Red-backed whiptail (Aspidoscelis xanthonota) 
 Chihuahuan spotted whiptail (Aspidoscelis exsanguis)  
 Common spotted whiptail (Aspidoscelis gularis) 
 Orange-throated whiptail (Aspidoscelis hyperythra) 
 Species split from Aspidoscelis inornata:
 Little striped whiptail (Aspidoscelis inornata)  (diploid) and:
 Little white whiptail (Aspidoscelis (inornata) gypsi)   (split from A. inornata)
 Pai striped whiptail (Aspidoscelis (inornata) pai)   (split from A. inornata)
 Arizona striped whiptail (Aspidoscelis (inornata) arizonae)   (split from A. inornata)
 Plateau striped whiptail (Aspidoscelis velox)  (triploid)
 Neaves' whiptail (Aspidoscelis neavesi)
 Laredo striped whiptail (Aspidoscelis laredoensis)  
 Marbled whiptail (Aspidoscelis marmorata
 Giant whiptail (Aspidoscelis motaguae) * 
 New Mexico whiptail (Aspidoscelis neomexicana)  
 Aspidoscelis tesselata complex:
 Common checkered whiptail (Aspidoscelis tesselata)  (diploid, former A. grahamii)) and:
 Gray checkered whiptail (Aspidoscelis dixoni)  (split from A. tesselata)
 Colorado checkered whiptail (Aspidoscelis neotesselata)  (triploid, former A. tesselata)
 Plateau spotted whiptail (Aspidoscelis scalaris) 
 Six-lined racerunner (Aspidoscelis sexlineata) 
 Sonoran spotted whiptail (Aspidoscelis sonorae)  
 Gila spotted whiptail (Aspidoscelis flagellicauda)   (sometimes in A. sonorae)
 Tiger whiptail (Aspidoscelis tigris) 
 Desert grassland whiptail (Aspidoscelis uniparens)  
 Rainbow whiptail (Cnemidophorus lemniscatus) *
 Argentine giant tegu (Salvator merianae) * 
 Gold tegu (Tupinambis teguixin) *

Family: Xantusiidae (night lizards) 
 Species split from the desert night lizard (Xantusia vigilis) :
 Desert night lizard (Xantusia vigilis)
 Arizona night lizard (Xantusia arizonae) 
 Sierra night lizard (Xantusia sierrae)
 Wiggins' night lizard (Xantusia wigginsi)
 Bezy's night lizard (Xantusia bezyi) 
 Sandstone night lizard (Xantusia gracilis) 
 Granite night lizard (Xantusia henshawi) 
 Island night lizard (Xantusia riversiana)

Family: Varanidae (monitor lizards) 

 Nile monitor (Varanus niloticus) *
 Savannah monitor (Varanus exanthematicus) * 
 Common water monitor (Varanus salvator) *

Suborder: Amphisbaenia

Family: Rhineuridae (North American worm lizards)

Suborder: Serpentes

Family: Typhlopidae (blind snakes) 
 Brahminy blindsnake (Indotyphlops braminus) *

Family: Boidae (boas)

Family: Colubridae (colubrids) 
 

Subfamily: Natricinae
 

Subfamily: Dipsadinae
 

Subfamily: Xenodontinae

Family: Viperidae

Family: Elapidae

Family: Leptotyphlopidae (slender blind snakes)

Family: Acrochordidae (file snakes) 
 Javanese file snake (Acrochordus javanicus) *

Family: Pythonidae (pythons) 
 Burmese python (Python bivittatus) * (P. (molurus) bivittatus: , introduced to Florida)
 Northern African rock python (Python sebae) *

See also

List of amphibians of North America north of Mexico
List of U.S. state amphibians
List of U.S. state reptiles
List of threatened reptiles and amphibians of the United States
List of U.S. state birds
List of birds of North America
List of U.S. state mammals
List of mammals of North America
Lists of reptiles by region
Lists of amphibians by region

Notes

References

Further reading

External links
8th Edition of Scientific and Standard English Names of Amphibians and Reptiles of North America North of Mexico published by the Society for the Study of Amphibians and Reptiles, available on the website of the American Society of Ichthyologists and Herpetologists
Scientific and Common Names of the Reptiles and Amphibians of North America – Explained, Ellin Beltz, 2006

The Reptile Database, Uetz, P. and Jirí Hošek (eds.)
US Fish & Wildlife Service – Species Search, U.S. Fish and Wildlife Service

Reptilia endangered species
US Fish & Wildlife Service – Endangered Species Program
NOAA; National Marine Fisheries Service – Endangered Species Act
The IUCN Red List of Threatened Species